Beccariophoenix fenestralis is a species of plant in the family Arecaceae. It was described as a species distinct from Beccariophoenix madagascariensis in 2014.

Description
Beccariophoenix fenestralis is a palm tree which grows about 10 meters tall.

It differs from B. madagascariensis when a seedling, in having wide, mostly unsplit leaves, whereas the B. madagascariensis has fully split, very stiff upright leaves when young.

Range and habitat
Beccariophoenix fenestralis is known from a single location in Brickaville, Atsinanana region, growing in humid lowland forest at 140 meters elevation.

Conservation and threats
There is only one known population of the species, with an area of occupancy (AOO) of 4 km2. It is threatened by harvesting of mature plants and habitat loss from shifting cultivation. Its habitat is not protected. Its conservation status is assessed as Critically Endangered.

References

Cocoseae
Endemic flora of Madagascar
Plants described in 2014
Flora of the Madagascar lowland forests